No Te Va Gustar, also known by their initials NTVG, is an Uruguayan rock band formed in 1994 in Montevideo. The group consists of Emiliano Brancciari (lead vocals and guitar), Guzmán Silveira (bass), Diego Bartaburu (drums), Martín Gil (trumpet), Denis Ramos (trombone), Mauricio Ortiz (tenor saxophone), Pablo Coniberti (guitar) and Francisco Nasser (keyboards).

History
No Te Va Gustar were formed in 1994, when most of their members were around the age of 16. After some initial moves in the formation, the group stabilized as a trio made up of Emiliano Brancciari (guitar), Mateo Moreno (bass) and Pablo Abdala (drums). Between 1996 and 1997, with the inclusion of percussion and wind instruments, after the arrival of the musicians Pamela Retamoza, Emiliano García, Santiago Svirsky and Martín Gil, the music of the band began to evolve fusing various American rhythms (reggae, candombe, ska, salsa, murga) without neglecting its rock essence. The band started to gain recognition in 1998 when they won the Third Song Festival of Montevideo and another competition organized by the Montevideo City Council Youth Commission. In 1999 the band toured various venues in Montevideo.

In July 1999, the band began recording their first album entitled Solo De Noche. It was released independently on December and was entirely produced by Juan Campodónico, with the collaboration of Emiliano Brancciari and Mateo Moreno. It also had the participation of Fito Páez in the composition. The album was inspired by the Latin rock that emerged in the 1990s, and its lyrics criticize the Uruguayan government. After the release of the album, Svirsky left the group and was replaced by Denis Ramos. During the summer of 2000 the band toured the east coast of Uruguay. In April 2000, their album was officially presented at the Sala Zitarrosa in the city of Montevideo, with sold out locations. After that show, they continued with a tour throughout 2000 and 2001 throughout Uruguay, while they performed their first shows in Buenos Aires. A year later the number of members was reduced, after the saxophonists (Retamoza and García) decided to leave. They were replaced by Mauricio Ortiz.

During 2002, the band recorded its second album titled Este Fuerte Viento Que Sopla in Santiago, Chile. From that moment on No Te Va Gustar began solidifying their position as one of the defining groups of Uruguayan rock. The album was certified Gold by the Cámara Uruguaya de Productores de Fonogramas y Videogramas six months after its release.

In 2004, the band toured different countries in South America, and at the end of the year their third studio album titled Aunque Cueste Ver El Sol was released. The record release concert attracted an audience of 10,000 people, and the show was recorded for release on DVD in 2005. The band also did a European tour, playing dates in more than 40 cities including Munich, Hamburg, Bremen, Berlin, Vienna, Bern, and Madrid. That same year No Te Va Gustar celebrated its 10 years as a band in Montevideo. Marcel Curuchet also joined on keyboards.

No Te Va Gustar recorded and released their fourth album Todo es tan inflamable in 2006, then promoted the album in various concerts in Uruguay and Argentina. Also in 2006, group members Mateo Moreno (bass) and Pablo Abdala (drums) left the group citing personal reasons. Diego Bartaburu joined as drummer, and the previous one, Abdala, was announced as responsible for the artistic production. Guzmán Silveira joined as bassist.

In 2008 they performed at the River Plate Stadium in Quilmes Rock, where they shared the stage with Guasones, Los Ratones Paranoicos, Las Pelotas and Los Piojos. On October 22, they released their fifth studio album called El Camino Más Largo, recorded at Elefante Blanco between May and August of the same year.

In 2010, the band released their sixth album, called Por Lo Menos Hoy, and it was presented on March 19, 2011 in Montevideo for 60,000 people, in a free show. It was presented in Argentina in April 2011, with four shows at Luna Park. That same month the album reached gold certification in that country. It was also certified triple Platinum in Uruguay. 

The band received two nominations at the 2011 Latin Grammy Awards, participating in the Best Rock Album category with their album Por Lo Menos Hoy and in the Best Rock Song category with the song "Chau."

In 2012, they released their first compilation album, Público, which was certified Gold by the Argentine Chamber of Phonograms and Videograms Producers. It was nominated at the 13th Annual Latin Grammy Awards for Best Rock Album. On July 12, Marcel Curuchet was admitted to the Jersey City Medical Center after a motorcycle accident on the New Jersey Turnpike Extension in Jersey City, New Jersey. Two days later, on July 14, Curuchet was noted to be in critical condition and died shortly after that announcement.

The band's album El Calor Del Pleno Invierno was released on October 18, and reached number one on the Argentine and Uruguayan Charts, as well as being certified double and triple platinum respectively.

In January 2013 Francisco Nasser (son of Uruguayan singer-songwriter Jorge Nasser) joined the band as keyboardist. The band earned two Latin Grammy nominations in the categories Best Rock Album and Best Rock Song with "A Las Nueve"; a Shock Colombia Awards nomination for Best Latin American New Wave Artist and an MTV Europe Music Awards nomination for Best South American Artist.

El Tiempo Otra Vez Avanza, the album's fifth studio album, was released on October 9, 2014, and topped the Uruguayan chart. It was recorded in the studios Elefante Blanco in Montevideo and Romaphonic in Buenos Aires between June and July of that year, and produced by Joe Blaney, the historic producer of Charly García and The Clash. Hugo Fattorusso, Emiliano y el Zurdo, Alfonsina Rossberg, Diego Rossberg and Charly García appear as special guests.

Suenan Las Alarmas, an album with darker lyrics and music, was released on June 2, 2017 and reached number one on Argentina and Uruguay, being certified Gold in the latter. Its singles were "Prendido Fuego", "Para Cuando Me Muera", and "Los Villanos", and it was produced by Héctor Castillo.

After an extensive presentation tour of Suenan Las Alarmas, they released Otras Canciones in April 2019. It contains classic songs by the band such as "A las nueve" or "Chau" remade in an acoustic style with guests such as Jorge Drexler and Julieta Venegas. It was released on April 12, 2019, and reached number one in Uruguay. 

In 2020 Gonzalo Castex left the band. No Te Va Gustar eleventh studio album, titled Luz, was released on May 7, 2021, and reached number one in Uruguay. It was preceded by four singles, including "No Te Imaginás" and "Venganza", featuring Nicki Nicole, which reached numbers 90 and 39 on the Argentina Hot 100 respectively.

Band members
Current members
 Emiliano Brancciari – lead vocals, guitar (1994-present)
 Martin Gil – trumpet, background vocals (1997-present)
 Denis Ramos – trombone, background vocals (2000-present)
 Mauricio Ortiz – saxophone (2001-present)
 Diego Bartaburu – drums (2006-present)
 Guzmán Silveira – bass, background vocals (2007-present)
 Pablo Coniberti – guitar, background vocals (2009-present)
 Francisco Nasser – keyboards, guitar, background vocals (2012-present)

Former members
 Gonzalo Castex – percussion (1994-2020)
 Pablo Adbala – drums (1994-2006)
 Mateo Moreno – bass (1994-2007)
 Pamela Retamoza – saxophone (1996-2001)
 Emiliano García – saxophone (1996-2001)
 Santiago Svirsky – trombone (1996-2000)
 Marcel Curuchet † – keyboards (2005-2012)

Discography
 Solo De Noche (1999)
 Este Fuerte Viento Que Sopla (2002)
 Aunque Cueste Ver El Sol (2004)
 Todo Es Tan Inflamable (2006)
 El Camino Más Largo (2008)
 Por Lo Menos Hoy (2010)
 El Calor Del Pleno Invierno (2012)
 El Tiempo Otra Vez Avanza (2014)
 Suenan Las Alarmas (2017)
 Otras Canciones (2019)
 Luz (2021)

References

External links 
 Official Website 

Latin music groups
Musical groups established in 1994
Uruguayan rock music groups